Mbabaram (Barbaram) is an extinct Australian Aboriginal language of north Queensland. It was the traditional language of the Mbabaram people. Known speakers were Albert Bennett, Alick Chalk, Jimmy Taylor and Mick Burns. Recordings of Bennett and Chalk are held in the Audiovisual Archive of the Australian Institute of Aboriginal and Torres Strait Islander Studies. R. M. W. Dixon described his hunt for a native speaker of Mbabaram in his book Searching for Aboriginal Languages: Memoirs of a Field Worker.  Most of what is known of the language is from Dixon's field research with Bennett.

Classification
Until R. M. W. Dixon's work on the language, "Barbaram" (as it was then known) was thought to be too different from other languages to be part of the Pama–Nyungan language family. Dixon revealed it to have descended from a more typical form, that was obscured by subsequent changes. Dixon (2002) himself, however, still regards genetic relationships between Mbabaram and other languages as unproven.

Albert Bennett identified Agwamin as the language most subjectively similar to Mbabaram.

Geographic distribution
Mbabaram was spoken by the Mbabaram tribe in Queensland, southwest of Cairns.

Nearby tribal dialects were Agwamin, Djangun (Kuku-Yalanji), Muluridji (Kuku-Yalanji), Djabugay, Yidiny, Ngadjan (Dyirbal), Mamu (Dyirbal), Jirrbal (Dyirbal), Girramay (Dyirbal), and Warungu. While these were often mutually intelligible, to varying degrees, with the speech of the adjacent tribes, none were even partially intelligible with Mbabaram. The Mbabaram would often learn the languages of other tribes rather than vice versa, because Mbabaram was found difficult.

Phonology

Vowels

Consonants

Phonological history

Vowels
Mbabaram would have originally had simply three vowels, like most Australian languages, but several changes occurred to add  to the system:
The first consonant of each word was then dropped, leaving the distribution of  unpredictable.

Word for "dog" 
Mbabaram is famous in linguistic circles for a striking coincidence in its vocabulary. When Dixon finally managed to meet Bennett, he began his study of the language by eliciting a few basic nouns; among the first of these was the word for "dog". Bennett supplied the Mbabaram translation, dog. Dixon suspected that Bennett had not understood the question, or that Bennett's knowledge of Mbabaram had been tainted by decades of using English. But it turned out that the Mbabaram word for "dog" was in fact dúg, pronounced almost identically to the Australian English word (compare true cognates such as Yidiny gudaga, Dyirbal guda, Djabugay gurraa and Guugu Yimidhirr gudaa, for example). The similarity is a complete coincidence: there is no discernible relationship between English and Mbabaram. This and other false cognates have been cited by typological linguist Bernard Comrie as a caution against deciding that languages are related based on a small number of lexical comparisons.

References

Bibliography

External links 
 Bibliography of Mbabaram language and people resources, at the Australian Institute of Aboriginal and Torres Strait Islander Studies

Southern Pama languages
Extinct languages of Queensland
Coincidence